38 Virginis b is a super-Jupiter exoplanet orbiting within the habitable zone of the star 38 Virginis about 108.5 light-years (33.26 parsecs) from Earth in the constellation Virgo.  The exoplanet was found by using the radial velocity method, from radial-velocity measurements via observation of Doppler shifts in the spectrum of the planet's parent star.

Characteristics

Mass
38 Virginis b is a super-Jupiter, an exoplanet that has a mass larger than that of the planet Jupiter. It has a minimum mass of 4.51 .

Host star
The planet orbits a (F-type) star named 38 Virginis. The star has a mass of 1.18  and a radius of around 1.46 . It has a temperature of 6557 K and is about 1.9 billion years old. In comparison, the Sun is about 4.6 billion years old and has a temperature of 5778 K. The star is metal-rich, with a metallicity ([Fe/H]) of 0.16, or 117% the solar amount. Its luminosity is 3.48 times that of the Sun.

The star's apparent magnitude, or how bright it appears from Earth's perspective, is 6.11. Therefore, 38 Virginis is on the edge of not being visible to the naked eye, but it can be clearly spotted with binoculars.

Orbit
38 Virginis b orbits its star every 825 days at a distance of 1.82 AU (close to Mars's orbital distance from the Sun, which is 1.53 AU). It likely receives 3% more sunlight as the Earth does from the Sun, due to its effective temperature being close to that of the Earth (in fact, only 3 degrees warmer).

Discovery
The search for 38 Virginis b started when its host star was chosen an ideal target for a planet search using the radial velocity method (in which the gravitational pull of a planet on its star is measured by observing the resulting Doppler shift), as stellar activity would not overly mask or mimic Doppler spectroscopy measurements. It was also confirmed that 38 Virginis is neither a binary star nor a quickly rotating star, common false positives when searching for transiting planets. Analysis of the resulting data found that the radial velocity variations most likely indicated the existence of a planet. The net result was an estimate of a 4.52  planetary companion orbiting the star at a distance of 1.82 AU with an eccentricity of 0.03.

The discovery of 38 Virginis b was reported in the online archive arXiv on August 29, 2016.

Notes

References

Exoplanets discovered in 2016
Virgo (constellation)
Exoplanets detected by radial velocity
Giant planets in the habitable zone